More information: United International Airlines

Air Sofia was an airline based in Sofia, Bulgaria. It operated charter flights to destinations in Europe, Africa, the Far East, South America and the Middle East. It also leased and wet leased aircraft to other airlines. Its main base was Sofia Airport.

Since 6 August 2008 Air Sofia's established Flight Training Organization FTO, according to JAR-FCL.
Nowadays Air Sofia conducts flight training for PPL, CPL, ATPL, MCC.

History

The airline was established in 1992 and started operations on 11 February 1992. It was owned by Georgi Ivanov (Managing Director) and Lilian Todorov (President). By March 2007 it employed 150 staff. On 5 March 2007 Bulgaria prohibited five Bulgarian carriers including Air Sofia. The airline relocated to Serbia under a new name, United International Airlines.

Fleet

At January 2005 the airline operated: 
6 Antonov An-12
1 Antonov An-24
1 Boeing 737-800, disposed of April 2005
Cessna 172 N
Piper PA-44 Seminole180 turbo

References

External links

Air Sofia

Defunct airlines of Bulgaria
Airlines established in 1992
Airlines disestablished in 2007
2007 disestablishments in Bulgaria
Bulgarian companies established in 1992